Herseth is a surname. Notable people with the surname include:

Adolph Herseth (1921–2013), American trumpeter
Erik Herseth (1892–1993), Norwegian sailor and Olympic gold medallist
Læge Storm Herseth (1897–1985), Norwegian chess player
Max Herseth (1892–1976), Norwegian rower and Olympic bronze medallist
Ralph Herseth (1909–1969), American politician

See also
Stephanie Herseth Sandlin, born 1970, American politician, granddaughter of Ralph
The Herseths U.S. political family including Ralph and Stephanie